The Bram Stoker Award for Best Short Non-Fiction, established in 2019, is an award presented by the Horror Writers Association (HWA) for "superior achievement" in horror writing for short non-fiction.

Honorees

References 

Short Non-fiction
Awards established in 2019